1965 may refer to:

 The year 1965
 1965 (film), a 2015 Singaporean historical thriller film
 1965 (album), a 1998 rock album by the Afghan Whigs